Brothers and Sisters may refer to:

Books
 Brothers and Sisters, a 1994 novel by Bebe Moore Campbell
 Brothers and Sisters, a novel by Ivy Compton-Burnett

Film and television
 Brothers and Sisters (1979 TV series), an American sitcom
 Brothers and Sisters (1980 film), a 1980 British film
 Brothers and Sisters (1992 film), a 1992 Italian film
 Brothers and Sisters (1998 TV series), a British television series starring Sandra Bee, John Adewole, and Mark Arden
 Brothers & Sisters (2006 TV series), an American television series
 "Brothers & Sisters" (Family Guy), episode of Family Guy
 "Brothers and Sisters" (The Green Green Grass), episode of The Green Green Grass
 "Brothers & Sisters" (Arrow), an episode of Arrow

Music
 Brothers and Sisters (album), by The Allman Brothers Band
 Brothers & Sisters (album), a 2014 album by Soil & "Pimp" Sessions
 Brother, Sister, an album by mewithoutYou
 Brother Sister, an album by the Brand New Heavies

Songs
 "Brothers and Sisters", a song by Ziggy Marley & the Melody Makers / Ziggy Marley Joy and Blues (1993)
 "Brothers and Sisters", a song by 2 Funky 2 (1993)
 "Brothers & Sisters" (song), a 1999 single by Coldplay	
 "Brothers and Sisters", a song by Blur from Think Tank (2003)
 "Brothers and Sisters", a song by Twin Atlantic from Great Divide (2004)
 "Brothers and Sisters", a song by Joe Kum Yung Memorial Band & Dallas Tamaira from the single Happy Cones (2004)

See also
 Sibling, an individual who has one or both parents in common
 Birth order
 Brother and Sister (disambiguation)
 Sisters and Brothers (disambiguation)
 Sisters & Brothers, a 2011 Canadian film
 The Sisters Brothers (novel) 2011 Western novel
 The Sisters Brothers (film), 2018 Western film